Matteo Rossetti (born 23 July 1998) is an Italian footballer who plays as a midfielder for  club Rimini on loan from Bari.

Club career

Torino 
Born in Saluzzo, Rossetti was a youth product of Torino.

Loan to Alessandria and Fermana 
On 4 August 2017, Rossetti was signed by Serie C side Alessandria on a season-long loan deal. On 9 November he made his Serie C debut for Alessandria as a substitute replacing Riccardo Cazzola in the 85th minute of a 4–0 home win over Olbia. On 23 December he made his second appearances, again as a substitute replacing Simone Branca in the 55th minute of a 5–1 home win over Pontedera. His loan was terminated during the 2018–19 season winter break and Rossetti returned to Torino leaving Alessandria with only 2 appearances, both as a substitute, but he remained an unused substitute 16 other times.

On 31 January 2018, Rossetti was loaned to another Serie C club, Fermana, on a 6-month loan deal. Eleven days later, on 10 February, he made his championship debut for Fermana as a substitute replacing Victor Da Silva in the 83rd minute of a 4–2 home win over Teramo. He made 3 other appearances for the club, all as a substitute, against Triestina, Pordenone and AlbinoLeffe. Rossetti ended his second part of the season with this 6-month loan to Fermana with only 4 appearances, all as a substitute, however he remained an unused substitute for 7 other matches.

Loan to Renate 
On 19 July 2018, Rossetti was signed by Serie C club Renate on a season-long loan deal. On 29 July he made his debut for Renate in a 2–0 home defeat against Rezzato in the first round of Coppa Italia, he was replaced by Emiliano Pattarello in the 46th minute. On 23 September he made his Serie C debut for Renate as a substitute replacing Reno Piscopo in the 65th minute of a 1–1 home draw against Vicenza Virtus. One week later, on 30 September, Rossetti played his first match as a starter for Renate, a 1–0 home defeat against Fermana, he was replaced by Francesco Finocchio in the 46th minute. On 21 October he played his first entire match for Renate, a 2–1 away defeat against Pordenone. Rossetti ended his loan to Renate with 25 appearances, 16 of them as a starter.

Loan to Avellino 
On 12 August 2019, Rossetti was loaned to newly promoted Serie C club Avellino on a season-long loan deal. Two weeks later, on 25 August he made his debut for the club in a 6–3 home defeat against Catania, he was replaced by Marco Silvestri in the 62nd minute. One more week later, on 1 September, Rossetti scored his first professional goal and the decisive goal in a 1–0 away win over Vibonese, he also played his first entire match for the club. Rossetti ended his season-long to Avellino with 25 appearances, including 12 of them as a starter, 1 goal and 2 assist, however he played only 2 entire matches during the loan. He also hepled the club to reach the play-off, however the club was eliminated by Ternana in the first round, he played the second half as a substitute.

Pordenone 
On 1 September 2020, Rossetti joined to Serie B club Pordenone for an undisclosed fee and he signed a 3-year contract. On 26 September he made his Serie B debut for the club in a 0–0 away draw against Lecce, he played the entire match. Four days later, on 30 September, he scored his first goal for the club in the 20th minute of a 3–0 home win over Casarano in the second round of Coppa Italia.

Bari
On 31 August 2021, he signed a three-year contract with Bari and was loaned to Teramo. On 15 July 2022, Rossetti was loaned to Rimini.

Career statistics

Club

Honours

Club 
Alessandria

 Coppa Italia Serie C: 2017–18

References

External links
 

1998 births
Living people
People from Saluzzo
Footballers from Piedmont
Italian footballers
Association football midfielders
Serie B players
Serie C players
Torino F.C. players
U.S. Alessandria Calcio 1912 players
Fermana F.C. players
A.C. Renate players
U.S. Avellino 1912 players
Pordenone Calcio players
S.S.C. Bari players
S.S. Teramo Calcio players
Rimini F.C. 1912 players
Sportspeople from the Province of Cuneo